Estuarine, Coastal and Shelf Science is a peer-reviewed academic journal on ocean sciences, with a focus on coastal regions ranging from estuaries up to the edge of the continental shelf. It's published by Elsevier on behalf of the Estuarine Coastal Sciences Association and edited by T.S. Bianchi, M. Elliott, I. Valiela, and E. Wolanski. The journal began in 1973 as Estuarine and Coastal Marine Science before the name was changed in 1981. The journal is abstracted and indexed in the Science Citation Index, Scopus, PASCAL, Biosis, INSPEC, GEOBASE, and Academic Search Premier. According to the Journal Citation Reports, the journal has a 2020 impact factor of 2.929.

References

External links 
 
 Estuarine Coastal Sciences Association

English-language journals
Elsevier academic journals
Oceanography journals
Publications established in 1973
Hybrid open access journals